Three Days of Viktor Chernyshov is a 1968 Soviet drama film directed by Mark Osepyan.

Plot 
The film takes place in the 60s. Viktor Chernyshev gets a job as a turner in a factory. He calmly reacted to the fact that his lazy peer Nikolai was boasting to his colleagues about his victories over women, who, in turn, listened with pleasure to him. And only doctor Peter tried to change the situation.

Cast 
 Gennadi Korolkov as Viktor Chernyshev
 Valentina Vladimirova as Katerina, Viktor's Mother
 Alexey Chernov as Uncle Pavel
 Lev Prygunov as Anton
 Gennady Sayfulin as Kolya
 Valeri Belyakov as Pyotr
 Ivan Kuznetsov as Semen Andreyevich
 D. Chukovsky as Rakmanov

References

External links 
 

1968 films
1960s Russian-language films
1960s teen drama films
1968 drama films
Soviet teen drama films